WDXL (1490 AM, "Southern Gospel AM 1490") was a radio station broadcasting a southern gospel music format. Licensed to Lexington, Tennessee, United States, the station was owned by Lexington Broadcasting Service, Inc. and featured programming from Citadel Media.

WDXL's owners surrendered its license to the Federal Communications Commission (FCC) on December 9, 2013; as a result, the FCC cancelled the station's license on December 18, 2013.

References

External links

DXL
Radio stations established in 1983
Defunct radio stations in the United States
Radio stations disestablished in 2013
Defunct religious radio stations in the United States
1983 establishments in Tennessee
2013 disestablishments in Tennessee
DXL